George Hogg (born 2 December 1869) was a Scottish footballer who spent most of his career with Heart of Midlothian.

Hogg began his career with home-town juvenile side West Calder before moving to nearby junior side Mossend Swifts. He moved to League side Hearts in 1892 and became a professional the following year, when professionalism was legalised in Scotland. During his time with the Gorgie side he won two League titles, in 1894-95 and 1896-97, and two Scottish Cup winners medals, in 1895-96 and 1900-01.

Although primarily a defensive player, earning the sobriquet "Tynecastle Warhorse" as a testament to his power and stamina, he was also capable of playing a more refined game when required. He played twice for the Scottish national team, both times in 1896. He made his debut in a 2–1 win against England and also played in a 3–3 draw with Ireland. He made one appearance for the Scottish League representative side.

Hogg retired after suffering a serious knee injury during the 1903-04 season. He later emigrated to South Africa where he spent the rest of his life.

References

External links

Appearances at londonhearts.com

1869 births
Year of death missing
Scottish footballers
Scotland international footballers
Heart of Midlothian F.C. players
Footballers from West Lothian
Scottish Football League players
Scottish Football League representative players
Association football wing halves
Mossend Swifts F.C. players
People from West Calder